The Harley Owners Group (HOG) is a sponsored community marketing club, operated by Harley-Davidson for enthusiasts of that brand's motorcycles.  The HOG is "the grandaddy of all community-building efforts," serving to promote not just a consumer product, but a lifestyle.  The HOG has also served to open new revenue streams for the company, with the production of tie-in merchandise offered to club members, numbering over one million strong, making it the largest factory-sponsored riding club in the world.  The Harley-Davidson community was the prototype for the ethnographic term subculture of consumption, defined as "a distinctive subgroup of society that self-selects on the basis of a shared commitment to a particular product class, brand, or consumption activity."

The Harley Owners Group was created in 1983 as a way to build longer-lasting and stronger relationships with Harley-Davidson's customers, by making ties between the company, its employees, and consumers.  HOG members typically spend 30% more than other Harley owners, on such items as clothing and Harley-Davidson-sponsored events.  Much of the intent of this branding effort is presenting Harley-Davidson as an American icon, with the focus on authenticity and pride in being American-made.  All of this is credited with turning flagging sales around, and allowing the Harley-Davidson company to grow again.

The name HOG comes from the word used to describe Harley-Davidson motorcycles. It is also Harley's corporate stock ticker symbol.

Organization
There is only one rule to become a Harley Owners Group member: The candidate must own a Harley-Davidson Motorcycle; the exception being that Associate Members can enroll under a Full Member (usually the passenger riding along with a Full Member). There are many benefits to becoming a member: discounts with insurance, motorcycle shipping, etc., mileage and member year recognition, rallies and events, and camaraderie.

Once a motorcycle owner is a member at the national level, he or she is then eligible to join one or as many local chapters as he or she wishes. It isn't required to join a local H.O.G. Chapter.

Each Harley-Davidson dealership has the opportunity to sponsor a local HOG Chapter. Some do not, but no chapters exist without a link to a sponsoring dealership and one Chapter per Dealership. Chapters, both in the USA and internationally are supported by Harley-Davidson employees based in Milwaukee, WI, with Regional H.O.G. Managers throughout the United States and H.O.G. Chapter Managers at the dealership level.

In some circumstances, where a sponsoring dealership closes, a chapter can continue without a sponsoring dealer. In about 2014, this was expanded (with some special circumstances) to two Chapters per dealership.

Chapters usually, but not always, elect officers from within their membership, produce a newsletter, and organize events throughout the year. Most events are ride-related. HOG Chapters are managed by volunteers. Some chapters collect dues from members to subsidize the costs of events and the administrative costs of running the chapter.

Events
On the chapter level, most HOG events are member-only rides with guests required to sign waivers. Many chapters host annual rallies either individually or collectively to cover a wider area (either states or countries) that are open to all HOG members regardless of chapter affiliation.  HOG themselves host several larger scale events and rallies that are open to all members.

Charitable work
In the United States, HOG's official charity is the Muscular Dystrophy Association.  HOG chapters are encouraged to support the MDA and/or other charities, though supporting a charity is not a requirement of a HOG chapter.

See also
 Outline of motorcycles and motorcycling

Hogart

References

External links

Motorcycle clubs
Motorcycle owners' groups
Harley-Davidson